Subhasis Chaudhuri (born 1963) is an Indian electrical engineer and the director at the Indian Institute of Technology, Bombay (IIT Bombay). He is a former K. N. Bajaj Chair Professor of the Department of Electrical Engineering of IIT Bombay. He is known for his pioneering studies on computer vision and is an elected fellow of all the three major Indian science academies viz. the National Academy of Sciences, India, Indian Academy of Sciences, and Indian National Science Academy. He is also a fellow of  Institute of Electrical and Electronics Engineers, and the Indian National Academy of Engineering. The Council of Scientific and Industrial Research, the apex agency of the Government of India for scientific research, awarded him the Shanti Swarup Bhatnagar Prize for Science and Technology, one of the highest Indian science awards, in 2004 for his contributions to Engineering Sciences.

Biography 

Subhasis Chaudhuri, born on 1 March 1963 at Bahutali, a small village in Murshidabad district, West Bengal to Santa and Nihar Kumar Chaudhuri, earned his graduate degree in Electronics and Electrical Communication Engineering from the Indian Institute of Technology, Kharagpur in 1985. Moving to Canada, he obtained a master's degree in Electrical Engineering from the University of Calgary in 1987 and joined the University of California, San Diego for his doctoral studies from where he secured a PhD in 1990. He returned to India the same year and started his career at the Indian Institute of Technology, Bombay as an assistant professor. He was promoted as an associate professor in 1994 and as a professor in 1998 and in 2005, he became the head of the department of electrical engineering, a post he held till 2008. During this period, he had three sabbaticals abroad; as a visiting professor at University of Erlangen-Nuremberg (1996) and at University of Paris XI (2002–03) and as an Alexander von Humboldt Fellow at Technical University of Munich (May–June 2007). He continues his service at IIT Bombay as a director  and holds the K. N. Bajaj Chair.

Chaudhuri is married to Sucharita Chatterjee and the couple has two children, Ushasi and Syomantak. The family lives in Powai, a suburb of Mumbai.

Legacy 

Chaudhuri's work have been mainly in the areas of pattern recognition, image processing, and computer vision. He is known to have developed a number of techniques including a methodology for acquiring super-resolved depth map from defocus and is one of the pioneers of researches in motion-free super-resolution. His work covered the fields of motion estimation, restoration, computational photography and biomedical image analysis which has applications in cytology, microscopy, material science, biomedical science and pharmaceutics. Computational haptics is another area of his researches. He has developed several new methodologies and holds US and Indian patents for a number of them. He has documented his researches by way of several articles; Google Scholar and ResearchGate, online article repositories of scientific articles, have listed many of them. Besides, he has co-authored six books viz. Motion-Free Super-Resolution, Hyperspectral Image Fusion,
Blind Image Deconvolution: Methods and Convergence, Depth From Defocus: A Real Aperture Imaging Approach, Video Analysis and Repackaging for Distance Education and Ambulation Analysis in Wearable ECG and edited two more, Perspectives and Policies on ICT in Society: An IFIP TC9 (Computers and Society) Handbook and Super-Resolution Imaging.

Chaudhuri sat in the editorial boards of several journals including International Journal of Computer Vision of Springer, IEEE Transactions on Pattern Analysis and Machine Intelligence of Institute of Electrical and Electronics Engineers and IET Computer Vision of Institution of Engineering and Technology. He chaired a program at the  2005 edition of International Conference on Computer Vision (ICCV) at Beijing and served as the program chair of Indian Conference on Computer Vision, Graphics and Image Processing (ICVGIP) held in 2006 at Mumbai; he also co-chaired the 2002 edition of ICVGIP. He has delivered invited or plenary speeches in several conferences including the Fifth National Conference on Computer Vision, Pattern Recognition, Image Processing and Graphics (NCVPRIPG) held in December 2015 at Patna and has been involved in external teaching programs of IIT Bombay and other institutions. He serves as a member of the Council of the Indian National Science Academy, the Publications Committee of International Conference on Robotics and Automation for Humanitarian Applications (RAHA 2016) and the Advisory Council of the Information Technology Research Academy. As the Dean of International Relations of IIT Bombay, he has been involved in inter-institutional cooperations; spearheading the IITB's efforts to open an off-campus in New York and the establishment of cooperation with International Cooperation Between the Advanced Institute of Manufacturing With High-Tech Innovations (AIM-HI), Taiwan count among them.

Patents 

Visual Object Tracking With Scale and Orientation Adaptation
A methodology for tracking objects in a video by segmenting an object in a video and tracking the location of each segments. The method has applications in remote sensing, surveillance and monitoring, and military.

Image Object Tracking and Segmentation Using Active Contours
A method of segmentation of video images involving identification of object contours and segmenting contours using an estimation of weighted length of contour segments.

Device and Method for Automatically recreating a Content Preserving and Compression Efficient Lecture Video
A video lesson, which involves merging of video and audio data captured by several fixed cameras placed in the lecture room, requires intense manual labor for converting it into a video lecture. Chaudhuri's method provides recreation of a lecture by automatic merging of the video and audio content by preserving content and compression efficiency. The system eliminates redundant and unstructured data streams.

System for creating a capsule representation of an instructional video
This method involves generation of a compressed video capsule of a lecture by recognizing activities and segmenting them based on the parameters of talking head, writing hand and slideshow using Hidden Markov model. The process separates the content frames of writing hand and slideshow from the non-content frames of talking head and a capsule is generated by selecting suitable content and non-content frames.

System and method for fusing images
The method involves identification and segregation of images into plurality of sets and fusing the sets into a fused image. Several such fused images are fused again to generate the desired fused image.

Awards and honors 
Chaudhuri received the Shri Hari Om Ashram Prerit Vikram Sarabhai Research Award of the Physical Research Laboratory in 2011, followed by the Prof. S. V. C. Aiya Memorial Award of the Institution of Electronics and Telecommunication Engineers, the same year. The Council of Scientific and Industrial Research awarded him the Shanti Swarup Bhatnagar Prize, one of the highest Indian science awards in 2004. The Prof. H.H. Mathur Excellence in Research Award of the Indian Institute of Technology, Bombay reached him in 2007 and he received the G. D. Birla Award for Scientific Research from the K. K. Birla Foundation in 2010. A year later, he was awarded the 2011 NASI-Reliance Industries Platinum Jubilee Award.

Chaudhuri has received three major research fellowships in his career; starting with Swarnajayanti Fellowship of the Department of Science and Technology in 2003, followed by the Alexander von Humboldt fellowship in 2007 and J. C. Bose National Fellowship of the Science and Engineering Research Board (SERB) in 2008. The year 2003 brought him two more honors viz. the elected fellowships of the National Academy of Sciences, India. and Indian National Academy of Engineering. Indian Academy of Sciences elected him as their fellow in 2005 and he became a fellow of the Institute of Electrical and Electronics Engineers in 2011. In 2012, he received the elected fellowship of the Indian National Science Academy.

Selected bibliography

Authored books

Edited books

Articles

See also 

 Facial recognition system
 Super-resolution imaging
 Haptic technology
 Active contour model

Notes

References

External links

Further reading 
 

Recipients of the Shanti Swarup Bhatnagar Award in Engineering Science
1963 births
Indian scientific authors
Indian electrical engineers
Indian computer scientists
People from Murshidabad district
IIT Kharagpur alumni
University of Calgary alumni
University of California, San Diego alumni
Academic staff of IIT Bombay
Academic staff of the University of Erlangen-Nuremberg
Academic staff of the University of Paris
Fellows of the Indian Academy of Sciences
Fellows of the Indian National Science Academy
Fellows of The National Academy of Sciences, India
Fellow Members of the IEEE
20th-century Indian inventors
Living people
Fellows of the Indian National Academy of Engineering
Engineers from West Bengal
20th-century Indian engineers
21st-century Indian inventors
Indian Institute of Technology directors